The gens Digitia was a plebeian family at ancient Rome.  Members of this gens are first mentioned during the Second Punic War.

Origin
The first of the Digitii was an Italian ally of Rome, who received the Roman franchise in recognition of great heroism during the taking of Carthago Nova in 210 BC.

Members
This list includes abbreviated praenomina. For an explanation of this practice, see filiation.

 Sextus Digitius, the first of the name to appear in history, was an Italian, who served as a marine (socius navalis) under Scipio Africanus.  He and Quintus Trebellius claimed to have been the first to have scaled the walls of Carthago Nova in 209 BC.  They were awarded the corona muralis for their bravery, and Digitius evidently received the Roman franchise.
 Sextus Digitius, probably the marine under Scipio Africanus, was praetor in 194 BC, and received the province of Hispania Ulterior.  He was appointed legate by Scipio Asiaticus to collect a fleet at Brundisium in 190, and was sent as ambassador to Macedonia in 174.  The following year, he was sent to Apulia to purchase provisions for the fleet and the army.
 Sextus Digitius (Sex. f.), military tribune in 170 BC, was probably the son of the praetor of 194.  He served in Macedonia and Greece under the consul Aulus Hostilius Mancinus, and reported his defeats upon returning to Rome to perform a sacrifice.

See also
 List of Roman gentes

References

Roman gentes